The Cathedral of Saint Augustine is the mother church of the Roman Catholic Diocese of Tucson. It is located in Tucson, Arizona.

History
The cathedral parish's history began with the founding of the chapel of the Royal Presidio of San Agustin in Tucson, which was constructed in 1776. By the 1850s, both the presidio and its chapel had fallen out of use, so Father Joseph Machebeuf was sent to survey the condition of the area in the 1860s. He advised the Bishop of Santa Fe that a priest should be assigned to the location, which had a population of 600 people.

In 1862 or 1863, Father Donato Rogieri arrived from Santa Fe, New Mexico to the small village of Tucson. At the time, it consisted of little more than sun-baked adobe homes near the Santa Cruz River, with no house of worship. After services were over, Father Donato and his parishioners would go to the Solano Leon place (where the Manning House is now at) and pick up adobe bricks and carry them back to the site of the church and one brick
placed on top of another was how the walls were constructed.  

Father Jean B. Salpointe was appointed as pastor of the new church in 1866. Work on the structure—commonly referred to as a cathedral, even then—was completed by 1868. The Holy See declared the territory of Arizona an apostolic vicariate later that year, and Salpointe was appointed Vicar Apostolic. 

The church was rebuilt by Bishop Peter Bourgade in 1897; the original plans called for a Gothic structure, but the spires were never completed. It was only in 1928 that the brick structure was transformed into its present Mexican baroque form, including the cast stone façade, which was inspired by the Cathedral of Querétaro, Mexico.

A restoration project, which entirely demolished and rebuilt the cathedral with the exception of its façade and towers, coincided with the centenary anniversary of the completion of the original church. It was initiated in 1966 and completed in 1968.

Architecture
The cathedral features an elaborate cast stone façade with the coat of arms of Pope Pius XI, who was the pope at the time of the building's construction. Various indigenous desert plants are featured in the stone designs, such as yucca and saguaro blossoms, as well as a representation of the Mission San Xavier del Bac.

A large 12th- or 13th-century crucifix hanging inside the cathedral's vestibule was carved at Pamplona, Spain.

The cathedral's floor is set on a slight grade, so that the main altar is clearly in view of the entire congregation. The seating can accommodate up to 1,250 people.

The pipe organ was designed and built by David McDowell in Tucson and has thirty-eight ranks.

St. Augustine’s New Look
As part of the first ground-up restoration project since 1968, the oldest cathedral in town began renovations under the leadership of John Alan a Phoenix artist and Historic Preservationist. The artist recognized the existing and potential beauty of the church and was brought in to enhance the sacred space and worship experience. Trompe l'oeil style painting and ornamental art are used frequently to create a more inviting atmosphere within the church.

Inside the cathedral dozens of improvements have been made. All of the stained-glass artwork has been refreshed. The upper levels of glass pay homage to the apostles and the first 4 bishops of Tucson. The lower level of stained- glass follows the history of St. Augustine. 
The side altars, also known as retablos, were made from handcrafted wood and decorated to honor the Blessed Sacrament Chapel and Our Lady of Guadalupe Shrine.
 
The crown jewel of the makeover is the Pamplona Crucifix. The crucifix was carved in Spain and is at least 600 years old. It was a special gift to the cathedral and installed in 1981. Much work was done to preserve, strengthen, and enhance this sacred object. It now rests on the back wall of the sanctuary behind the altar. 

The church also received updates in lighting and sound technology and the pews have been redesigned after the style in 1897. The tile flooring was also revamped.

On the outside the sanctuaries old white walls were covered in a warm beige paint. In addition, the nearly one-hundred-year-old statues of the Immaculate Conception and the Sacred Heart of Jesus were restored. 

From the repairs on the roof to the tiles on the floor, this restoration project took over two years. To celebrate its completion, a re-dedication mass was led by the Bishop of Tucson, Gerald Kicanas, on February 12, 2011. Hundreds from the faithful Catholic community turned out for this special day.

The total cost for all renovations was over US$1 million, donated by members of the diocese.

Gallery

See also
List of Catholic cathedrals in the United States
List of cathedrals in the United States

References

External links 

Official Cathedral Site
Roman Catholic Diocese of Tucson Official Site

Augustine Tucson
Roman Catholic churches in Arizona
Catholic Church in Arizona
Roman Catholic churches in Tucson, Arizona
Religious organizations established in 1776
Roman Catholic churches completed in 1968
Tourist attractions in Tucson, Arizona
Churches in Pima County, Arizona
Spanish Colonial Revival architecture in Arizona
Cathedrals in Arizona
20th-century Roman Catholic church buildings in the United States